The Republican marches were a series of rallies that took place in cities across France on 10–11 January 2015 to honour the victims of the Charlie Hebdo shooting, the Montrouge shooting and the Porte de Vincennes siege, as well as to voice support for freedom of speech and freedom of the press. French government officials estimated that the rallies were attended by up to 3.7 million people nationwide, making them the largest public rallies in French history. By their broad appeal, they were the first mass movement of their kind since 1944, when Paris was liberated from the Germans at the end of World War II.

In Paris, due to the expected number of people, three streets were planned for the march from Place de la République to Place de la Nation. It was estimated that between 1.5 and 2 million people marched down and nearby Boulevard Voltaire in Paris. The Paris marches were attended by over 80 world leaders, from both Europe and around the world, including President François Hollande. The presence during the marches of foreign leaders who are accused of not respecting freedom of speech in their own country has been criticised.

In other cities in France, more than 300,000 rallied in Lyon, about a quarter of its population. More than 100,000 marched in the streets of Rennes, Toulouse, Bordeaux, Grenoble, Montpellier and Marseille (within two days). Major rallies took place in Montreal, Brussels, Berlin, Amsterdam and Vienna.

In an interview prior to the Republican marches, cartoonist Luz, one of the survivors of the Charlie Hebdo attack, described the show of support for the magazine as "wonderful", but bemoaned a lack of diversity of views in the public discourse following the attacks, which he said served the purposes of politicians, as well the use of symbols, which he characterised as contrary to the values of the magazine. He noted that, following the attacks, "La Marseillaise" had been sung many times by the public, which his dead colleagues would have scorned. Also speaking prior to the marches, Willem, another surviving cartoonist, said that a demonstration in support of free expression would be "naturally a good thing", but rejected the support of far-right figures such as Marine Le Pen and Geert Wilders: "We vomit on those who suddenly declare that they are our friends".

Main places

January 10

France

International 
  Brussels: 3,000
  Amsterdam: 18,000 (8 January)
  New York City: 2,000
  San Francisco: 500
  Boston: 1,000

January 11

France

International

Notable participants

France

International 
Europe

North America
  Steven Blaney (Minister of Public Security of Canada)
  Jane D. Hartley (United States Ambassador to France)
  Victoria Nuland (Assistant Secretary of State for European and Eurasian Affairs)

South America
  José Bustani (Brazilian Ambassador to France)

Asia

Africa

Institutions

Did not attend 

  Prime Minister of Iceland Sigmundur Davíð Gunnlaugsson did not attend the march; his office released a statement citing the short notice, travel time and the Prime Minister's schedule, and emphasized that no invitation had been rejected, as none had been sent to him specifically. Sigmundur Davíð was the only Western European head of government not to attend the march; instead Iceland was represented by the deputy head of mission at the Icelandic Embassy in Paris, Nína Björk Jónsdóttir. Sigmundur Davíð's absence was criticized in Iceland, and his office acknowledged that a high-ranking official should have attended the march.
  President of the United States Barack Obama did not attend the Paris march, citing the short notice and the logistics of providing the necessary security. The Secret Service said it was not consulted and an agency official acknowledged that the Secret Service had pulled off previous last minute trips. White House spokesman Josh Earnest said that they "should have sent someone with a higher profile" than United States Ambassador to France Jane Hartley. United States Attorney General Eric Holder and United States Deputy Secretary of Homeland Security Alejandro Mayorkas were in Paris for a security summit convened after the shootings, but did not attend the Paris rally. The lack of senior American officials was criticized.

National Front controversy 
During the organisation march, a controversy arose when Marine Le Pen was told she was not invited in the marches. This is due to the National Front reputation of divisiveness. François Lamy, one of the organisers, said it is not where the National Front should be; it is not where a political party which, for years, has divided French citizens because of their origin or their religion should be. The President closed this political issue declaring that "every citizen can come...it is not controlled."

References

External links 

 

2015 in France
2015 in Paris
2015 protests
Charlie Hebdo shooting
Events relating to freedom of expression
Protest marches
Protests in France